Elliot Robert Lee (born 16 December 1994) is an English professional footballer who plays as a midfielder for Wrexham. 

Lee started his career at West Ham United, where he was loaned to Colchester United, Southend United, Blackpool and current club Luton Town, before joining Barnsley in 2016 for an undisclosed fee. Lee left Barnsley after a year to sign for Luton and after five years with the club, signed for current club, Wrexham. He is the son of former footballer Rob Lee and the brother of footballer Olly Lee.

Career

West Ham United
Born in Durham, Lee was a youth team player with West Ham United, making his debut for the reserve team in 2011 before signing his first professional contract in August 2012. His first appearance in a first-team squad was on 1 January 2013 when he was an unused substitute in a Premier League match against Norwich City. Lee then made his professional debut for West Ham, as a 78th-minute substitute for Ricardo Vaz Tê, on 16 January 2013 in a 1–0 defeat in the FA Cup third round replay at Old Trafford against Manchester United.

On 12 August 2013, Lee scored two first half goals for the West Ham development squad against Aston Villa Under-21s. On 31 August he made his Premier League debut for West Ham, coming on as an 88th-minute substitute for Mohammed Diamé in a 1–0 home defeat by Stoke City. Three weeks later, Lee scored a hat-trick against Newcastle Reserves in a 5–4 away win. He went on to score 11 matches that season for the development squad.

Loan to Colchester United
On 22 October 2013 he signed for Colchester United on a one-month youth loan. His only Colchester goal was scored on 2 November in an away draw against Rotherham United: in stoppage time in the second half, with Rotherham winning 2–1, Lee scored with a header which hit the bar and bounced over the line to make the final score 2–2. He returned to West Ham on 21 November after four appearances and one goal for Colchester United.

Loan to Southend United
On 31 October 2014 Lee joined Southend United on a three-month loan. Within hours of signing for Southend, Lee suffered a hamstring injury and returned to West Ham for treatment. On 5 November Lee was ruled out of playing for at least two months. His loan was cancelled on 6 November and he returned to West Ham United, his parent club.

Loan to Luton Town
On 19 February 2015, Lee joined Luton Town on loan for one month. Lee chose to wear the number 38 shirt in memory of his former teammate at West Ham, Dylan Tombides who also wore number 38. He scored on his debut for Luton two days later, four minutes after coming on as a substitute for Andy Drury in a 3–2 defeat away to AFC Wimbledon. On 24 March 2015, Lee scored twice in a 2–3 home defeat by Wycombe Wanderers. On scoring he revealed a T-shirt showing a picture of Tombides, to whom he dedicated his goals. The following day his loan contract with Luton was extended until the end of the 2014–15 season. Luton manager John Still said of Lee "Elliot's been fantastic for us and we're thrilled to have him for the rest of this season."

Return to West Ham
Lee scored another hat-trick for the development squad when they faced Conference Premier club Woking in a pre-season friendly on 5 August 2014. Lee was an unused substitute in the League Cup penalty shoot-out defeat by Sheffield United in the second round on 26 August 2014. He was given the number 36 for the first team the same day. On his first start for West Ham, on 9 July 2015, Lee scored his first goal for the club. In a Europa League first qualifying round match away against FC Lusitanos of Andorra, he scored the only goal from a cross from Matt Jarvis.

Loan to Blackpool
On 26 November 2015, Lee was loaned to League One club Blackpool until 3 January 2016. He made his debut two days later, as a half-time substitute for Bright Osayi-Samuel in a 1–0 win over local rivals Fleetwood Town at Bloomfield Road. In January 2016, having picked up an injury, Lee refused the offer of an extension to his loan and returned to West Ham. His refusal angered Blackpool manager, Neil McDonald, who was quoted as saying that Lee "would rather be at home with his mum and dad" than playing for Blackpool.

Second loan to Colchester United
On 18 January 2016, Lee signed on loan for Colchester United until the end of the 2015–16 season. He scored his first goal of his second spell on 12 March in a 3–3 draw with Wigan Athletic. He scored once more, making 15 appearances in total.

Barnsley
On 24 June 2016, Lee signed for Championship club Barnsley for an undisclosed fee. He made six appearances during the 2016–17 season, all as a substitute, but left the club by mutual consent on 4 July 2017.

Luton Town
Following his release from Barnsley on 4 July 2017, Lee signed for his former loan club Luton Town on a two-year contract. He scored in an 8–2 win over Yeovil Town on the opening day of the 2017–18 season on 5 August 2017.

His contract was extended by a further year at the end of the 2017–18 season after a promotion clause was triggered as a result of Luton's promotion to League One.

On 20 May 2022, it was announced that Lee would leave the club following the end of the 2021–22 season.

Loan to Oxford United
He joined Oxford United on loan until the end of the season on 1 February 2021. He scored six goals in eighteen appearances, all in League One.

Loan to Charlton Athletic
On 26 August 2021, Lee joined Charlton Athletic on a season-long loan for the 2021–22 campaign. He scored his first goal for Charlton in an EFL Trophy tie against Crawley Town on 31 August 2021.

Wrexham
On 8 July 2022, Lee signed a three-year deal with Wrexham. On 6 August 2022, Lee scored twice on his debut to help Wrexham come from behind to beat Eastleigh 2-1

Personal life
He is the son of former Charlton Athletic, Newcastle United and England midfielder Rob Lee. His older brother, Olly, is also a professional footballer.

He attended Brentwood School in Essex.

Career statistics

Honours
Luton Town
EFL League Two runner-up: 2017–18
EFL League One: 2018–19

References

External links
Elliot Lee profile at the Luton Town F.C. website

1994 births
Living people
Sportspeople from Durham, England
Footballers from County Durham
English footballers
People educated at Brentwood School, Essex
Association football forwards
West Ham United F.C. players
Colchester United F.C. players
Southend United F.C. players
Luton Town F.C. players
Blackpool F.C. players
Barnsley F.C. players
Oxford United F.C. players
Charlton Athletic F.C. players
Wrexham A.F.C. players
Premier League players
English Football League players
National League (English football) players